The 6AQ5 (Mullard–Philips tube designation EL90) is a miniature 7-pin (B7G) audio power output beam tetrode vacuum tube with ratings virtually identical to the 6V6 at 250 V. It was commonly used as an output audio amplifier in tube TVs and radios. There are versions of this tube with extended ratings for industrial application which are  designated as 6AQ5A (with controlled heater warm-up characteristic), and 6AQ5W/6005 or 6005W (shock and vibration resistant).

A push–pull pair is capable of producing at least 10W audio output power in class AB1.

Other close or equivalent tube types are: 6HG5, 6HR5, 6669, 6BM5, N727, CV1862 and the Tesla 6L31. The 6CM6, like the Russian 6P1P (6П1П), while electrically equivalent (up to 250 V anode voltage), have a 9 pin (B9A) base. Another similar, but not identical,  amplifier pentode with a miniature 9-Pin base (B9A), used in consumer electronics was the 6M5.

See also
List of vacuum tubes

References

External links
Several tube data sheets
 Tube Data Sheet Locator

Vacuum tubes
Guitar amplification tubes